Greenbrier is a neighborhood in southeastern Lexington, Kentucky, United States. At the time of its building in the 1960s it was a rural subdivision, though it is now bounded by new subdivisions to its west. Its boundaries are Winchester Road to the north, Walnut Grove Lane to the east, east of Blackford Parkway to the south, and the Hamburg Farm to the west.

Neighborhood statistics
 Area: 
 Population: 333
 Population density: 513 people per square mile
 Median household income: $95,107 (2010)

References

Neighborhoods in Lexington, Kentucky